The 1910 Giro di Lombardia was the sixth edition of the Giro di Lombardia cycle race and was held on 6 November 1910. The race started in Milan and finished in Sesto San Giovanni. The race was won by Giovanni Micheletto.

General classification

References

1910
Giro di Lombardia
Giro di Lombardia